Jerome Vincent Collins (born August 18, 1982) is a former American football tight end. He was drafted by the St. Louis Rams in the fifth round of the 2005 NFL Draft. He played college football at Notre Dame.

Early years
Jerome attended Wheaton Warrenville South High School from 1996 to 2000.  He was on the undefeated 1998 Illinois (IHSA) football championship team for division 6-A, which at the time was the most populated division of Illinois high schools.  Jerome played high school football with former University of Illinois quarterback Jon Beutjer and Northwestern University wide receiver Jon Schweighardt.  Collins received special mention on Champaign News-Gazette All-state team. He was a three-year starter who helped his team to state titles as a sophomore and junior followed by an 8-3 mark in 1999. He caught 35 passes for 450 yards and five touchdowns as a senior in 1999 and made 31 catches for 702 yards and eight touchdowns as junior. Collins averaged 11.6 points and 6.8 rebounds as a senior in basketball and earned All-league honors and ran the second leg on the 1999 state championship 4x100 relay.

College career
Collins moved to tight end for his final season at Notre Dame. He appeared in twelve games, but did not start any games while catching six passes for 67 yards (11.2 avg). He was involved in two blocked punts and totaled 4 tackles (3 solos) on special teams action. Collins played in 10 games at defensive end and linebacker for the Irish in 2003 and also contributed on special teams. He finished the season with nine tackles (seven solos) and one tackle for a loss. In 2002, he played in 11 games as a reserve at outside linebacker.  As a sophomore in 2001 Collins played in three games as a reserve at outside linebacker and made one tackle. In 2000, he did not see action after changing positions from wide receiver to outside linebacker during the 2000 season.

Professional career

St. Louis Rams
Collins was the 144th pick of the 2005 NFL Draft by the St. Louis Rams from the University of Notre Dame. He was on the Rams practice squad and also the 53-man roster (playing three games) before being released.

Dallas Cowboys
After he was released from the Rams the Cowboys signed Collins to be on their practice squad.

Indianapolis Colts
He signed with the Colts on October 4, 2006.  He was placed on injured reserve after injuring his Achilles tendon during practice in December 2006.  On February 23, 2007, the Colts released Collins.

New York Giants
He was signed to the New York Giants practice squad prior to the week 1 game against the Cowboys and was signed to the active roster after week 15.  He has been on back to back Super Bowl winning rosters with the Colts and Giants, although he had not appeared in a game for either team.  He was released by the Giants on August 30, 2008 during final cuts.

References

External links
Indianapolis Colts bio
New York Giants bio

1982 births
Living people
Players of American football from Columbus, Georgia
African-American players of American football
American football tight ends
Notre Dame Fighting Irish football players
St. Louis Rams players
Dallas Cowboys players
Indianapolis Colts players
New York Giants players
Sportspeople from DuPage County, Illinois
21st-century African-American sportspeople
20th-century African-American people